Impossible Planet may refer to:

 "Impossible Planet", an episode of Philip K. Dick's Electric Dreams
 "The Impossible Planet", an episode of Doctor Who
 "The Impossible Planet" (short story), a short story by Philip K. Dick